The Pine Valley Chapel and Tithing Office, the chapel sometimes being referred to as the Pine Valley Ward Chapel, are  historic 19th-century buildings of the Church of Jesus Christ of Latter-day Saints (LDS Church) in Pine Valley, Washington County, Utah, that are jointly listed on the National Register of Historic Places.

Description
Built in 1868, the Pine Valley Chapel is known for being the oldest meetinghouse in continuous use of the LDS Church. Both the chapel and adjacent tithing office were listed together on the U.S. National Register of Historic Places November 20, 1970.

Chapel architecture
The Pine Valley Chapel was designed by a Scottish shipbuilder and LDS convert, Ebenezer Bryce (who Bryce Canyon is named after).  The construction of the chapel was built using techniques adopted from shipbuilding, and is basically an upside-down ship.  the building consists of two levels built on a basement. The architectural style is reminiscent of New England churches, which was done in honor of LDS church leader Erastus Snow.  The church was built with nearby Ponderosa pines, from the same area where pines were shipped to Salt Lake City for the famous Salt Lake Tabernacle. A scaled-down replica of the Pine Valley Chapel was built at This Is the Place Heritage Park.

Tithing Office
East of the chapel is the well-preserved red-brick Tithing Office that was built in the 1880s.  Tithing to the church in 19th century Utah was often paid in-kind with farmed goods that were then redistributed to those in need, thus the 19th century tithing house is a 16' x 27' warehouse to accommodate tithes. The building has also, at different times, been used as a family residence, the Pine Valley Post Office, and a meeting room for the Pine Valley Chapel.

See also

 National Register of Historic Places listings in Washington County, Utah

References

External links

 

Tithing buildings of the Church of Jesus Christ of Latter-day Saints
19th-century Latter Day Saint church buildings
Buildings and structures in Washington County, Utah
Commercial buildings on the National Register of Historic Places in Utah
Meetinghouses of the Church of Jesus Christ of Latter-day Saints in Utah
Properties of religious function on the National Register of Historic Places in Utah
Churches completed in 1868
Tourist attractions in Washington County, Utah
Historic American Buildings Survey in Utah
National Register of Historic Places in Washington County, Utah